AI safety is an interdisciplinary field concerned with preventing accidents, misuse, or other harmful consequences that could result from artificial intelligence (AI) systems. It encompasses machine ethics and AI alignment, which aim to make AI systems moral and beneficial, and AI safety encompasses technical problems including monitoring systems for risks and making them highly reliable. Beyond AI research, it involves developing norms and policies that promote safety.

Motivations 

AI researchers have widely different opinions about the severity and primary sources of risk posed by AI technology – though surveys suggest that experts take high consequence risks seriously. In two surveys of AI researchers, the median respondent was optimistic about AI overall, but placed a 5% probability on an “extremely bad (e.g. human extinction)” outcome of advanced AI. In a 2022 survey of the Natural language processing (NLP) community, 37% agreed or weakly agreed that it is plausible that AI decisions could lead to a catastrophe that is “at least as bad as an all-out nuclear war.” Scholars discuss current risks from critical systems failures, bias, and AI enabled surveillance; emerging risks from technological unemployment, digital manipulation, and weaponization; and speculative risks from losing control of future artificial general intelligence (AGI) agents.

Some have criticized concerns about AGI, such as Stanford University adjunct professor Andrew Ng who compared them to "worrying about overpopulation on Mars when we have not even set foot on the planet yet." Others, such as University of California, Berkeley professor Stuart J. Russell urge caution, arguing that "it is better to anticipate human ingenuity than to underestimate it."

Background 

Risks from AI began to be seriously discussed at the start of the computer age:

From 2008 to 2009, the AAAI commissioned a study to explore and address potential long-term societal influences of AI research and development. The panel was generally skeptical of the radical views expressed by science-fiction authors but agreed that "additional research would be valuable on methods for understanding and verifying the range of behaviors of complex computational systems to minimize unexpected outcomes."

In 2011, Roman Yampolskiy introduced the term "AI safety engineering" at the Philosophy and Theory of Artificial Intelligence conference, listing prior failures of AI systems and arguing that "the frequency and seriousness of such events will steadily increase as AIs become more capable."

In 2014, philosopher Nick Bostrom published the book Superintelligence: Paths, Dangers, Strategies. His argument that future advanced systems may pose a threat to human existence prompted Elon Musk, Bill Gates, and Stephen Hawking to voice similar concerns.

In 2015, dozens of artificial intelligence experts signed an open letter on artificial intelligence calling for research on the societal impacts of AI and outlining concrete directions. To date, the letter has been signed by over 8000 people including Yann LeCun, Shane Legg, Yoshua Bengio, and Stuart Russell.

In the same year, a group of academics led by professor Stuart Russell founded the Center for Human-Compatible AI at UC Berkeley and the Future of Life Institute awarded $6.5 million in grants for research aimed at "ensuring artificial intelligence (AI) remains safe, ethical and beneficial."

In 2016, the White House Office of Science and Technology Policy and Carnegie Mellon University announced The Public Workshop on Safety and Control for Artificial Intelligence, which was one of a sequence of four White House workshops aimed at investigating "the advantages and drawbacks" of AI. In the same year, Concrete Problems in AI Safety – one of the first and most influential technical AI Safety agendas –  was published.

In 2017, the Future of Life Institute sponsored the Asilomar Conference on Beneficial AI, where more than 100 thought leaders formulated principles for beneficial AI including "Race Avoidance: Teams developing AI systems should actively cooperate to avoid corner-cutting on safety standards."

In 2018, the DeepMind Safety team outlined AI safety problems in specification, robustness, and assurance. The following year, researchers organized a workshop at ICLR that focused on these problem areas.

Research foci 
AI safety research areas include robustness, monitoring, and alignment. Robustness is concerned with making systems highly reliable, monitoring is about anticipating failures or detecting misuse, and alignment is focused on ensuring they have beneficial objectives.

Robustness 
Robustness research focuses on ensuring that AI systems behave as intended in a wide range of different situations, which includes the following subproblems:
 Black swan robustness: building systems that behave as intended in rare situations.
 Adversarial robustness: designing systems to be resilient to inputs that are intentionally selected to make them fail.

Black swan robustness 
Rare inputs can cause AI systems to fail catastrophically. For example, in the 2010 flash crash, automated trading systems unexpectedly overreacted to market aberrations, destroying one trillion dollars of stock value in minutes. Note that no distribution shift needs to occur for this to happen. Black swan failures can occur as a consequence of the input data being long-tailed, which is often the case in real-world environments. Autonomous vehicles continue to struggle with ‘corner cases’ that might not have come up during training; for example, a vehicle might ignore a stop sign that is lit up as an LED grid. Though problems like these may be solved as machine learning systems develop a better understanding of the world, some researchers point out that even humans often fail to adequately respond to unprecedented events like the COVID-19 pandemic, arguing that black swan robustness will be a persistent safety problem.

Adversarial robustness 
AI systems are often vulnerable to adversarial examples or “inputs to machine learning models that an attacker has intentionally designed to cause the model to make a mistake”. For example, in 2013, Szegedy et al. discovered that adding specific imperceptible perturbations to an image could cause it to be misclassified with high confidence. This continues to be an issue with neural networks, though in recent work the perturbations are generally large enough to be perceptible.

All of the above images are predicted to be an ostrich after the perturbation is applied. (Left) is a correctly predicted sample, (center) perturbation applied magnified by 10x, (right) adversarial example.

Adversarial robustness is often associated with security. Researchers demonstrated that an audio signal could be imperceptibly modified so that speech-to-text systems transcribe it to any message the attacker chooses. Network intrusion and malware detection systems also must be adversarially robust since attackers may design their attacks to fool detectors.

Models that represent objectives (reward models) must also be adversarially robust.  For example, a reward model might estimate how helpful a text response is and a language model might be trained to maximize this score. Researchers have shown that if a language model is trained for long enough, it will leverage the vulnerabilities of the reward model to achieve a better score and perform worse on the intended task. This issue can be addressed by improving the adversarial robustness of the reward model. More generally, any AI system used to evaluate another AI system must be adversarially robust. This could include monitoring tools, since they could also potentially be tampered with to produce a higher reward.

Monitoring 
Monitoring focuses on anticipating AI system failures so that they can be prevented or managed. Subproblems of monitoring include flagging when systems are uncertain, detecting malicious use, understanding the inner workings of black-box AI systems, and identifying hidden functionality planted by a malicious actor.

Estimating uncertainty 
It is often important for human operators to gauge how much they should trust an AI system, especially in high-stakes settings such as medical diagnosis. ML models generally express confidence by outputting probabilities; however, they are often overconfident, especially in situations that differ from those that they were trained to handle. Calibration research aims to make model probabilities correspond as closely as possible to the true proportion that the model is correct.

Similarly, anomaly detection or out-of-distribution (OOD) detection aims to identify when an AI system is in an unusual situation. For example, if a sensor on an autonomous vehicle is malfunctioning, or it encounters challenging terrain, it should alert the driver to take control or pull over. Anomaly detection has been implemented by simply training a classifier to distinguish anomalous and non-anomalous inputs, though several other techniques are in use.

Detecting malicious use 
Scholars and government agencies have expressed concerns that AI systems could be used to help malicious actors to build weapons, manipulate public opinion, or automate cyber attacks. These worries are a practical concern for companies like OpenAI which host powerful AI tools online. In order to prevent misuse, OpenAI has built detection systems that flag or restrict users based on their activity.

Transparency 
Neural networks have often been described as black boxes, meaning that it is difficult to understand why they make the decisions they do as a result of the massive number of computations they perform. This makes it challenging to anticipate failures. In 2018, a self-driving car killed a pedestrian after failing to identify them. Due to the black box nature of the AI software, the reason for the failure remains unclear.

One benefit of transparency is explainability. It is sometimes a legal requirement to provide an explanation for why a decision was made in order to ensure fairness, for example for automatically filtering job applications or credit score assignment.

Another benefit is to reveal the cause of failures. At the beginning of the 2020 COVID-19 pandemic, researchers used transparency tools to show that medical image classifiers were ‘paying attention’ to irrelevant hospital labels.

Transparency techniques can also be used to correct errors. For example, in the paper “Locating and Editing Factual Associations in GPT,” the authors were able to identify model parameters that influenced how it answered questions about the location of the Eiffel tower. They were then able to ‘edit’ this knowledge to make the model respond to questions as if it believed the tower was in Rome instead of France. Though in this case, the authors induced an error, these methods could potentially be used to efficiently fix them. Model editing techniques also exist in computer vision.

Finally, some have argued that the opaqueness of AI systems is a significant source of risk and better understanding of how they function could prevent high-consequence failures in the future. “Inner” interpretability research aims to make ML models less opaque. One goal of this research is to identify what the internal neuron activations represent. For example, researchers identified a neuron in CLIP that responds to images of people in spider man costumes, sketches of spiderman, and the word ‘spider.’ It also involves explaining connections between these neurons or ‘circuits’. For example, researchers have identified pattern-matching mechanisms in transformer attention that may play a role in how language models learn from their context. “Inner interpretability” has been compared to neuroscience. In both cases, the goal is to understand what is going on in an intricate system, though ML researchers have the benefit of being able to take perfect measurements and perform arbitrary ablations.

Detecting trojans 
ML models can potentially contain ‘trojans’ or ‘backdoors’:  vulnerabilities that malicious actors maliciously build into an AI system. For example, a trojaned facial recognition system could grant access when a specific piece of jewelry is in view; or a trojaned autonomous vehicle may function normally until a specific trigger is visible. Note that an adversary must have access to the system’s training data in order to plant a trojan. This might not be difficult to do with some large models like CLIP or GPT-3 as they are trained on publicly available internet data. Researchers were able to plant a trojan in an image classifier by changing just 3 out of 3 million of the training images. In addition to posing a security risk, researchers have argued that trojans provide a concrete setting for testing and developing better monitoring tools.

Alignment

Systemic safety and sociotechnical factors 
It is common for AI risks (and technological risks more generally) to be categorized as misuse or accidents. Some scholars have suggested that this framework falls short. For example, the Cuban Missile Crisis was not clearly an accident or a misuse of technology. Policy analysts Zwetsloot and Dafoe wrote, “The misuse and accident perspectives tend to focus only on the last step in a causal chain leading up to a harm: that is, the person who misused the technology, or the system that behaved in unintended ways… Often, though, the relevant causal chain is much longer.” Risks often arise from ‘structural’ or ‘systemic’ factors such as competitive pressures, diffusion of harms, fast-paced development, high levels of uncertainty, and inadequate safety culture. In the broader context of safety engineering, structural factors like ‘organizational safety culture’ play a central role in the popular STAMP risk analysis framework.

Inspired by the structural perspective, some researchers have emphasized the importance of using machine learning to improve sociotechnical safety factors, for example, using ML for cyber defense, improving institutional decision-making, and facilitating cooperation.

Cyber defense 
Some scholars are concerned that AI will exacerbate the already imbalanced game between cyber attackers and cyber defenders. This would increase 'first strike' incentives and could lead to more aggressive and destabilizing attacks. In order to mitigate this risk, some have advocated for an increased emphasis on cyber defense. In addition, software security is essential preventing powerful AI models from being stolen and misused.

Improving institutional decision-making 
The advancement of AI in economic and military domains could precipitate unprecedented political challenges. Some scholars have compared AI race dynamics to the cold war, where the careful judgment of a small number of decision-makers often spelled the difference between stability and catastrophe. AI researchers have argued that AI technologies could also be used to assist decision-making. For example, researchers are beginning to develop AI forecasting and advisory systems.

Facilitating cooperation 

Many of the largest global threats (nuclear war, climate change, etc) have been framed as cooperation challenges. As in the well-known prisoner’s dilemma scenario, some dynamics may lead to poor results for all players, even when they are optimally acting in their self-interest. For example, no single actor has strong incentives to address climate change even though the consequences may be significant if no one intervenes.

A salient AI cooperation challenge is avoiding a ‘race to the bottom’. In this scenario, countries or companies race to build more capable AI systems and neglect safety, leading to a catastrophic accident that harms everyone involved. Concerns about scenarios like these have inspired both political and technical efforts to facilitate cooperation between humans, and potentially also between AI systems. Most AI research focuses on designing individual agents to serve isolated functions (often in ‘single-player’ games). Scholars have suggested that as AI systems become more autonomous, it may become essential to study and shape the way they interact.

In governance 
AI governance is broadly concerned with creating norms, standards, and regulations to guide the use and development of AI systems. It involves formulating and implementing concrete recommendations, as well as conducting more foundational research in order to inform what these recommendations should be. This section focuses on the aspects of AI governance that are specifically related to ensuring AI systems are safe and beneficial.

Research 
AI safety governance research ranges from foundational investigations into the potential impacts of AI to specific applications. On the foundational side, researchers have argued that AI could transform many aspects of society due to its broad applicability, comparing it to electricity and the steam engine. Some work has focused on anticipating specific risks that may arise from these impacts – for example, risks from mass unemployment, weaponization, disinformation, surveillance, and the concentration of power. Other work explores underlying risk factors such as the difficulty of monitoring the rapidly evolving AI industry, the availability of AI models, and ‘race to the bottom’ dynamics. Allan Dafoe, the head of longterm governance and strategy at DeepMind has emphasized the dangers of racing and the potential need for cooperation: “it may be close to a necessary and sufficient condition for AI safety and alignment that there be a high degree of caution prior to deploying advanced powerful systems; however, if actors are competing in a domain with large returns to first-movers or relative advantage, then they will be pressured to choose a sub-optimal level of caution.”

Government action 

Some experts have argued that it is too early to regulate AI, expressing concerns that regulations will hamper innovation and it would be foolish to “rush to regulate in ignorance.” Others, such as business magnate Elon Musk, call for pre-emptive action to mitigate catastrophic risks. To date, very little AI safety regulation has been passed at the national level, though many bills have been introduced. A prominent example is the European Union’s Artificial Intelligence Act, which regulates certain ‘high risk’ AI applications and restricts potentially harmful uses such as facial recognition, subliminal manipulation, and social credit scoring.

Outside of formal legislation, government agencies have put forward ethical and safety recommendations. In March 2021, the US National Security Commission on Artificial Intelligence reported that advances in AI may make it increasingly important to “assure that systems are aligned with goals and values, including safety, robustness and trustworthiness." Subsequently, the National Institute of Standards and Technology drafted a framework for managing AI Risk, which advises that when "catastrophic risks are present - development and deployment should cease in a safe manner until risks can be sufficiently managed."

In September 2021, the People's Republic of China published ethical guidelines for the use of AI in China, emphasizing that AI decisions should remain under human control and calling for accountability mechanisms. In the same month, The United Kingdom published its 10-year National AI Strategy, which states the British government "takes the long-term risk of non-aligned Artificial General Intelligence, and the unforeseeable changes that it would mean for ... the world, seriously." The strategy describes actions to assess long-term AI risks, including catastrophic risks.

Government organizations, particularly in the United States, have also encouraged the development of technical AI safety research. The Intelligence Advanced Research Projects Activity initiated the TrojAI project to identify and protect against Trojan attacks on AI systems. The Defense Advanced Research Projects Agency engages in research on explainable artificial intelligence and improving robustness against adversarial attacks and The National Science Foundation supports the Center for Trustworthy Machine Learning, and is providing millions in funding for empirical AI safety research.

Corporate self-regulation 
AI labs and companies generally abide by safety practices and norms that fall outside of formal legislation. One aim of governance researchers is to shape these norms.[?] Examples of safety recommendations found in the literature include performing third-party auditing, offering bounties for finding failures, sharing AI incidents (an AI incident database was created for this purpose), following guidelines to determine whether to publish research or models, and improving information and cyber security in AI labs.

Companies have also made concrete commitments. Cohere, OpenAI, and AI21 proposed and agreed on “best practices for deploying language models,” focusing on mitigating misuse. To avoid contributing to racing-dynamics, OpenAI has also stated in their charter that “if a value-aligned, safety-conscious project comes close to building AGI before we do, we commit to stop competing with and start assisting this project” Also, industry leaders such as CEO of DeepMind Demis Hassabis, director of Facebook AI Yann LeCun have signed open letters such as the Asilomar Principles and the Autonomous Weapons Open Letter.

See also

Notes

References

External links 

 On the Opportunities and Risks of Foundation Models
 Unsolved Problems in ML Safety
 AI Accidents: An Emerging Threat
 Moral Machines
 Smarter Than Us
 Engineering a Safer World
 Building Secure & Reliable Systems
 A Dangerous Master

Artificial intelligence